The history of Union Sportive Médina d'Alger from 2010 to the present day , commonly referred to as USM Alger or simply USMA, is an Algerian professional association football club based in Algiers, whose first team play in the highest tier of Algerian football, the Ligue 1. Established on 5 July 1937. He won the first trophy in 1963 against MC Alger and reached the final of the cup. 17 time, a record, including five consecutive times from 1969 to 1973 and won eight first time in 1981 against ASM Oran and last against MC Alger in 2013 also made the USMA Super Cup twice either on the level of the Continental USM Alger did not achieve any title and the best result is the 2015 CAF Champions League Final The team landed to the second division of several times the first from 1965 to 1969 and, latest of which, the longest from 1990 to 1995 USMA won the UAFA Club Cup in 2013 against the Al-Arabi Club Kuwaiti 3–2 on aggregate as the first international title but is not recognized by FIFA.

Haddad ownership (2010–20)

Second professional era & Dream Team 

It was decided by the Ligue de Football Professionnel and the Algerian Football Federation to professionalize the Algerian football championship, starting from the 2010–11 season Thus all the Algerian football clubs which until then enjoyed the status of semi-professional club, will acquire the professional appointment this season. the president of the Algerian Football Federation, Mohamed Raouraoua, has been speaking since his inauguration as the federation's president in Professionalism, promising a new way of management based on rigor and seriousness, especially since football has bottomed out in recent seasons, due to the catastrophic management of the clubs which could not go And were lagging behind clubs in neighboring countries that have made extraordinary progress, becoming full-fledged professional clubs, which will enable them to increase their African continent, On August 4, 2010, USM Alger went public in conjunction with the professionalization of the domestic league. Algerian businessman Ali Haddad became the majority share owner after investing 700 million Algeria dinars to buy an 83% ownership in the club to become the first professional club in Algeria. On October 27, 2010, Haddad replaced Saïd Allik as president and owner of the club. Allik had been the club's president for the past 18 years.

The first season of professional football in Algeria it was difficult for USM Alger and is the worst since the 1999–2000 season, and Noureddine Saadi was removed from his post to be replaced by Frenchman Hervé Renard with a clause in his contract allows him to leave if he is solicited by a national selection. Al-Ittihad suffered a lot and did not achieve any victory for nearly 5 months. and waited until the last round to ensure survival after the victory against USM Annaba. In the following season Summer transfer window USMA made big deals that reached fifteen of the best players including four from ES Setif. The club has also dispensed with two of the oldest players in the club Hocine Achiou and Karim Ghazi after the coach refused to stay. On July 28, 2011, USM Alger signed a contract with American brand Nike for an indefinite period. which has the effect of greatly change the backbone of the team, USM Alger is then quickly dubbed the Dream Team by the Algerian media, particularly the newspapers.

On April 29, 2011, Ali Haddad was appointed Mouldi Aïssaoui as General Director of USM Alger. Less than a year after taking office On February 28, 2012 Aïssaoui announced his resignation from his post of société sportive et commerciale (SSPA), accusing certain parties in the club of "conspiring" against him. Aïssaoui stated "I had a frank discussion with USMA President Haddad, during which I informed him of my decision to leave my position. He certainly wanted to talk me out of it, but I made him understand that this decision was irrevocable". In 2011–12 Ligue 1, USM Alger competed for the title until the last round. on April 14, 2012, in a match against MC Saïda at Stade 13 Avril 1958 Where did they need victory to stay away from relegation to Ligue Professionnelle 2 and in the last minute Nouri Ouznadji scored the equalizer. after the end of the match, while on their way to the changing rooms USM Alger players were attacked by strangers, the most dangerous of which was the assault that Abdelkader Laïfaoui was subjected with a knife that almost killed him and due to his injuries he had to receive stitches and spend the night in hospital. then decided USM Alger lifting lawsuit against unknown persons also decided not to play in Saïda for five years. On May 12, 2012, in a match against JSM Béjaïa in Bologhine and after a great drama, the meeting witnessed the players of JSM Béjaïa applauding referee Farouk Houasnia after announcing three penalties for USM Alger, which they considered an attempt to provide assistance to them especially as the victory brings them closer to the title. It ended with a 4–3 loss which was the reason for losing it. With the end of the season after six years absence USM Alger returned to the continental competitions from the gate of Confederation Cup. USMA was also invited by the Union of Arab Football Associations to compete in the UAFA Club Cup in its new version. Mohamed "Hamia" Boualem player who was expected a lot in view of his talent and to have a great future, Almost three years after last playing for USMA, Boualem has just ended his short football career. Boualem had made his last appearance in the Red and Black colors one afternoon in March 2012. It was on the 24th, during the match that had played against CS Constantine. Boualem had been substituted in the 76th minute of play and had not played again. Height of misfortune, with the multiple ailments that he frequently knew, the talented usmist was seriously injured during a training session.

Back to the honors 

In the 2012–13 season, led by Argentine coach Miguel Angel Gamondi. The start was bad three defeats, two wins and a draw, in the sixth round against ES Setif and after the loss Gamondi was sacked from his post and replaced by former Olympique de Marseille coach Rolland Courbis as their new coach. who gave a good start and the end of the first leg with six wins, two draws and one defeat, in the return stage in the Ligue Professionnelle 1 was not a good start, and it was clear that winning the first Algerian professional league was very difficult, the start of the team focusing on the Algerian Cup and the Arab Club Champions Cup, where it was initially in the Algerian Cup in the semi-final against MC Oran. USMA achieved the most important goal through Noureddine Daham. to reach the team's final for the seventeenth time in history and the first in six years. In the Arab Club Champions Cup it was an easy road but in the semi-final against Ismaily SC, it was a difficult meeting that ended with a penalty shootout for USMA to reach the final for the first time in their history, but in the Confederation Cup, the club did not set it as a major goal and were excluded from the second round after losing against US Bitam.

In the Algerian Cup Final against neighbor MC Alger in the Algiers Derby for the fifth time in history. USM Alger defeated of them with a goal scored by Mokhtar Benmoussa. USMA won its eighth title. Also this was the first time that Al Ittihad won against Mouloudia in the final after four defeats before. After the end of the match and while heading to get the medals, MC Alger refused to go up in protest against the performance of referee Djamel Haimoudi. Two weeks later, USMA won its first Arab Club Champions Cup title after defeating Kuwait's Al-Arabi club 3–2 in aggregate in the 2012–13 UAFA Club Cup final. The match saw the presence of a number of state officials led by Prime Minister Abdelmalek Sellal who handed the cup to the captain Mohamed Rabie Meftah. On 21 September 2013, two USM Alger supporters died while attending the match against MC Alger, after the collapse of part of the Stade 5 Juillet 1962. The death of supporters Azeeb Sufyan and Saif al-Din Darhoum, and the injuries to several hundred others, spoiled the joy of winning the Darby supporters of USM Alger. The drama occurred ten minutes after the end of the match. In the 2013–14 season and after winning the Algerian Cup and the Arab Club Champions Cup last season, the goal of this season is the missed league title nine years ago. The start was not good in the first eight rounds and only won three matches, and after the victory over CRB Aïn Fakroun in the tenth round, Courbis resigned due to pressure, but one of the reasons for leaving was to return to France to coach his former club Montpellier. and he was replaced by his compatriot Hubert Velud. last season's champion with ES Setif, the start was more than wonderful, as the team did not lose in any match until the end of Season Sixteen victory, including eight consecutive to win the league easily, Fourteen points behind runners-up JS Kabylie for the first time since the 2004–05 season and the first in the era of professionalism. also returned again to the CAF Champions League for the first time since 2007, USM Alger in the mid-season returned after seven years of absence they won Super Cup title against 2012–13 Ligue 1 champions ES Sétif for the first time.

On December 21, 2013, in Algerian Cup USM Alger was eliminated at the hands of JS Kabylie, first loss against them in this competition and lose Title achieved last season, To end the season with two titles as the last season, the beginning of the 2014–15 season were not good where USM Alger was defeated at the opening of the season against MC Alger in the Super Cup. After the end of the match the assistant referee Mounir Bitam took off his shirt in protest against corruption in the arbitration wire and accused them of pressuring him to facilitate the task of Mouloudia, then apologized to all the administration and supporters of USM Alger. after the piece and in the defense of the league title trip initially were not good, On 23 August 2014, it witnessed the Clasico kabylo-algérois where it ended in a 2–1 victory and Youcef Belaïli's goal in the last minutes, But after the end of the match and while the players went to the changing rooms, JS Kabylie player Albert Ebossé Bodjongo was struck on the head by a projectile thrown by an unknown person while the teams were leaving the field, Bodjongo died a few hours later in hospital of a traumatic brain injury. He was aged 24. After a series of fluctuating results and from 15 matches he won in only five all of them in a row, USM Alger decided to dismiss Velud, although his career was successful during which he achieved two titles in a year and a half. He was replaced by German manager Otto Pfister. But the results were not good eight meetings without a win with the elimination in the Algerian Cup against ASO Chlef. last hope to end the season with title at least, less than three months after the appointed Pfister was sacked as coach of USM Alger. to take over all of Zeghdoud and Meftah temporarily to the end of the season the team to ensure survival in the final round after win against ASO Chlef.

Champions League final for the first time 

Summer 2015, Miloud Hamdi officially USMA coach for three seasons. Although the ambition was not great Hamdi led them to glory in the Champions League, where USM Alger ended the group stage in first place, to face in the semi-final Al Hilal realizing the surprise by defeating him in Sudan, and satisfied with a draw in Bologhine to qualify for the first time in its history to the final of a continental competition. where they faced TP Mazembe but was defeated Back and forth, 4–1 in aggregate. There was a great deal of controversy about the stadium hosting the final between Stade du 5 Juillet and Omar Hamadi Stadium, but managers, technical staff and players preferred the second option, which is something that the supporters did not like because it is small and it is not enough for the fans especially since it is a historical final and with artificial grass. Youcef Belaïli is suspended by Confederation of African Football for 2 years for having tested positive for Cocaine during an anti-doping control carried out during the match against MC El Eulma on August 7, 2015, counting for the CAF Champions League. He admits the facts, Bellaili is tested a second time positive for doping after consuming a prohibited product (Cocaine), during his team's match against CS Constantine counting for the fifth round of the Ligue Professionnelle 1, played on September 19, 2015, in Constantine. A four-year suspension is imposed on him, his contract with USM Alger is terminated in the wake. On the other hand, in the league, it achieved the title for the seventh time in its history and the second in the professional era. USM Alger achieved a very strong start and was not defeated in seventeen consecutive meetings, including seven consecutive victories, and in the second stage, the club's level decreased in a limited way, especially with its end and defeat against RC Relizane and JS Saoura then tied him in the Algiers Derby. Where did the players face great criticism, especially as the supporters wanted to celebrate the title against the traditional opponent, in the 27th round and after winning against ASM Oran among the teammates of the captain Nacereddine Khoualed the title, and in the 29th round celebrated players, the managers, crew members technical and supporters the shield championship. Algerian Champion for the seventh time last season, it's a USM Alger "new look" who will defend his title, Then in the final of the Super Cup, led by interim coach Mustapha Aksouh achieves title after beating city rivals MC Alger, With his new coach Paul Put in the stands.

On November 5 in the first meeting of Put was defeated in the Match derby against USM El Harrach after which USM Alger did not achieve positive away from home results with the end of the first leg where the team without a win outside Algiers, USM Alger lost the opportunity to defend their title last season and in the 28th round. Despite their big win against USM Bel-Abbès, they lost the title officially after ES Setif won against MO Béjaïa. the last match in the Ligue Professionnelle 1 was against JS Saoura and ended with a big victory for them and Oussama Darfalou scored the first hat-trick of USM Alger since three and a half years to finish the season in third place, the match saw the return of captain Nacereddine Khoualed after an absence of seven months due to injury. In the group stage of the CAF Champions League, in the final round against CAPS United and more than 50,000 spectators, the team needed to win to secure the lead and had a heavy 4–1 lead. then, in the 80th minute, the stadium witnessed a wonderful atmosphere in the stands to celebrate the 80th anniversary of the founding of the team in the presence of former stars in the team they are, Bengana, Mansouri, Abdouche, Mouassi, Lalili, Hadj Adlane, Ghoul, Achiou, Dziri, Rahim, and including former coach Noureddine Saadi, former President Saïd Allik and leaders of Algeria's National Liberation Front during Algerian War of Independence, Saadi Yacef who is in the same time former president of the club. the joy was completed by qualifying for the quarter-finals.

In the semi-final against the neighboring WAC Casablanca, it took place in a brotherly atmosphere especially since both were founded in the same year 1937, and despite the tense diplomatic relations between the two countries but the supporters of the two teams were on time. The supporters of Wydad were received in Algeria free tickets to the stadium and the same was done by WAC Casablanca in the second leg match. Then USM Alger returns to competition in the Ligue 1 and in the first match against USM El Harrach players and the coach was subjected to verbal abuse and yellowing by fans and in the second half the players refused to return because of scolding their mothers but were persuaded to complete the game despite the win, the players went under the whistle again and then in the derby against CR Belouizdad, the team managed to achieve a great victory 4–0, but in the games against the leaders CS Constantine and in the home lost 2–1 after the defeat, the difference becomes 12 points with three games postponed to announce after the end of the match, the coach Paul Put for his resignation put said he took all responsibility for the setbacks and said he had a great honor working with the team as he explained that today's (Means against CS Constantine) players did not put their feet in the ground and other things.

Abdelhakim Serrar general manager 
Just a day after the resignation of Paul Put, USM Alger administration contracted with the Franco Algerien coach Miloud Hamdi until the end of the season and had already coach the team in 2015–16 and led him to win the Ligue 1 and to the final of the CAF Champions League. The start was very good for the new coach where in the last seven games of the first phase he won four, three of them outside the home and drawn in two and was lost in one match but with the start of the second phase returned bad results again, especially inside the home and the number of points lost by the USM Alger in his stadium until round 21, 18 points to lose the opportunity to compete for the title after the difference became ten points from the leader to move the eyes of the team towards the Algerian cup but ended the experience in the Round of 16 to go out for the second season without a title, Immediately after the Algiers Derby and draw 2–2. on 28 February 2018 Ali Haddad he changed his brother Rabouh from a post general manager by former international player and former ES Setif president Abdelhakim Serrar. After the loss of the derby against CR Belouizdad, the new general manager decided, after agreeing with coach Hamdi, to end his work with the team at the end of the season. on April 3, Serrar moved to Morocco and agreed with Baddou Zaki to be the new coach starting next season. However, on April 12, Zaki said he would not coach USM Alger because of disagreement over some of the terms of the contract. At the end of the season Oussama Darfalou was crowned the league's top scorer with 18 goals as the second player of USM Alger achieves this award after the first in 2003. On April 4, 2018, the goalkeeper of the reserve team (U21) Abderrahmane Bouyermane died following a Cardiac arrest, announced on its official website. The 20-year-old suddenly collapsed on the pitch while warming up for practice.

With the end of the season the team started looking for a new coach and the squad saw the departure of many players, most notably Ayoub Abdellaoui, who joined the Swiss club FC Sion. and striker Oussama Darfalou, who joined Dutch club Vitesse. finally, after a month of research, the team contracted with French technical Thierry Froger to be the new coach. This season USM Alger is competing on four fronts. The first goal was to win the Confederation Cup, but they were eliminated in the quarter-finals against the Egyptian club Al-Masry. The Confederation of African Football required the club to choose between Stade Omar Oucief, Ahmed Zabana Stadium in Oran, Stade 8 Mai 1945 in Sétif as well as Stade Mohamed Hamlaoui in Constantine  faced with the non-approval of Omar Hamadi Stadium, the choice of the management went to Sétif for several reasons, including the proximity of the city to Algiers, which will allow supporters to be able to travel in droves, especially since a great relationship of brotherhood animates the Usmiste and Setifian galleries which have always supported each other in international competitions. Then in the Arab Club Champions Cup was the ambition to win, especially that the value of financial prizes exceed 15 million dollars. more than the CAF Champions League, but the march of The Reds and Blacks stopped in the second round against the Sudanese Al-Merrikh 4–3 on aggregate. before that in a match against Al-Quwa Al-Jawiya at Omar Hamadi Stadium and in the 70th minute withdrawal of Al-Quwa Al-Jawiya's players in protest at offensive chants from spectators. after mentioning the name of the former president Saddam Hussein and anti-Shia slogans angering Baghdad, The Iraqi ministry of foreign affairs summoned Algeria's ambassador in Baghdad over "sectarian chants" made by Algerian fans Ahmed Mahjoub, Iraq's foreign affairs spokesperson, said Baghdad had expressed "the government and the people of Iraq's indignation... at the glorification of the horrible face of Saddam Hussein's deadly dictatorial regime", which was toppled in 2003 during the United States' invasion of Iraq. later, general manager Abdelhakim Serrar said that the concerns of fans if bothered the Iraqi team, I offer my apologies. The goalkeeper and captain Mohamed Lamine Zemmamouche also apologized to the Iraqi delegation for the conduct of the supporters.

Then moved USM Alger's attention to the Ligue 1, Leader in the standings, USMA ensures at the same time to finish first at the end of the first phase of the championship Followed by JS Kabylie. after the outbreak of protests in Algeria and the arrest of club owner Ali Haddad on corruption charges. affected the results of USM Alger where he was defeated in three consecutive games, all Darby matches against Paradou AC, MC Alger and CR Belouizdad to shrink the difference to one point from the runner-up four games before the end of the season. On April 30, 2019, the board of the SSPA USMA met and noted the vacancy of the post of president of the company since the incarceration of Ali Haddad there is nearly a month. It was Boualem Chendri who was unanimously elected to succeed him while ETRHB Haddad remains the majority shareholder of the club. On May 26, 2019, And after the victory outside the home against CS Constantine 3–1 achieved the eighth Ligue 1 title, one point behind JS Kabylie. immediately after the end of the game Abdelhakim Serrar announced his resignation from his office.

The end of the ETRHB Haddad era 
On June 2, 2019, it is official, the Haddad family is selling its 92% shareholding in SSPA USMA. It was the club's communication officer, Amine Tirmane, who announced it on the Echourouk TV. the reasons that made them make this decision is the imprisonment of club owner Ali Haddad and also freeze all financial accounts of the club. On June 10, 2019, Several sports figures and former leaders linked to the USM Alger have set up a rescue committee to provide solutions to the many problems facing the club of Algiers. also Many club elders answered the call, they were more than twenty Tarek Hadj Adlane, Karim Ghazi, Hocine Achiou and Hocine Metref Also, the Haddad family is looking to sell its shares in SSPA. On June 24, 2019, USM Alger signed with Billel Dziri to be the new coach, the former USM Alger star gave him the power to choose the staff to work with them. On August 4, 2019, Al-Hayat Petroleum Company decided to pay the cost of travel to Niger in order to play the preliminary round of the CAF Champions League, the same company that wants to buy the majority of the shares of the club. On September 4, 2019, the players of USM Alger decided to go on strike to protest difficult financial situation. They stressed that this decision has nothing to do with the administration, the fans or the club itself. It is a protest movement against the state of the USM Alger and the delay in resolving the crisis. As a reminder, the USM Alger players have not received their salaries for 6 months, while the new ones have not received any salary since joining the club.

On October 13, 2019, the players decided to boycott the training and official matches because they have not been paid for five months, two days after Amine Tirmane club's communication officer submitted his resignation on the channel Dzaïr TV. A day later a fan paid the amount of 500,000 dinars per player reward win against Gor Mahia and AS Aïn M'lila. The players then decided to return to training and play CA Bordj Bou Arreridj match on October 23. After a protest in front of the headquarters of the Ministry of Youth and Sports against the difficult situation, Minister Raouf Salim Bernaoui said to supporters of the club that they have to be patient. On October 19, 2019, Nearly 5,000 supporters of USM Alger went out to the headquarters of the Wilaya of Algiers to protest against the club's difficult financial situation and free it from ETRHB Haddad Company. A day after Mounir D'bichi said to France 24 that Al-Hayat Petroleum is a subsidiary of ETRHB Haddad which also said that the team's debts amount to 1 billion dinar about 8 million euros. D'bichi said ETRHB Haddad had provided 400 billion centimes since its arrival about 23 million euros.

On October 22, 2019 Oussama Chita resumed training with his teammates after a long absence due to a serious injury contracted by the Algerian international last season at the knee. On October 29, 2019, the leaders of USM Alger have announced in a statement that the sponsorship deal with Kia Al Djazair will be terminated amicably and the club will recover all outstanding debts that are valued at nearly 20 billion centimes (1.4 million €) In addition, the contract with Ifri will not be renewed either by decision of the company. On November 5, the administration of USM Alger signed Sponsor contract with Serport specialized in port services for 16 billion centimes about 1.2 million euros. The administration of USM Alger to regain its right in the Darby case, appealed the arbitration decision issued by the Algerian Court for the settlement of sports disputes in case No. 92/19 between Union sportive de la médina d'Alger against the Algerian Football Federation and the Professional Football Association. This was the receipt of the receipt of the appeal from the Court of Arbitration for Sport in Lausanne on 8 January 2020 and the team paid the costs of registering the case with an amount of one thousand euros (€1000) on the morning of 9 January 2020. In the group stage meeting in CAF Champions League, Wydad Casablanca's captain Brahim Nekkach presented a special gift to Zemmamouche, which was a document dating back 77 years, which is a letter that Union Sportive Musulmane Algéroise had addressed to Wydad Casablanca in 1943 inviting him to participate in a friendly tournament in Algeria and confronting him.

USM Alger slogan and the conspiracy of the Minister of Justice & Ali Haddad
On January 27, 2021, The Algerian newspaper El Khabar, wrote that the historical president of USM Alger, Saïd Allik was not mistaken when he accused two influential men in the previous authority of interfering with the judiciary in favor of his opponent, businessman Ali Haddad, in what is known as the “Amateur Club” case, considering that he was subjected to a conspiracy by The former minister of Justice Tayeb Louh and his collaborators, The trial of Tayeb Louh revealed details of what a female judge in the Algerian Judicial Council was subjected to, who refused to submit to pressure and bear the punishment. In his lawsuit Allik was accusing Haddad who became the owner of the club since 2010 of exploiting the “USMA” slogan, which was not part of the club’s sale deal, without paying any consideration which forced the amateur club represented by Allik to seek compensation for material and moral damages worth 20 billion centimes. In 2017 a decision was issued by the Chamber of Commerce of the Algerian Judicial Council in favor of the amateur club, and Haddad was obliged to pay two billion centimes for the benefit of the institution represented by Saïd Allik. However Haddad did not accept this decision, and sought to obstruct it in any way, initially using the legal paths for a retrial, and then he exploited his influence in order for the decision to be in his favor in the case by intervening with Tayeb Louh who used as usual the inspector general to his ministry for this purpose. However Haddad encountered strong resistance from the president of the Chamber of Commerce at the time, which was established as a civil party in the case as compensation for what she was subjected to. 

In the meantime this judge was surprised that she was sent with a recommendation from the Ministry to participate in an international forum, which led to the delay in pronouncing the decision, and then the picture was completed by removing her from the presidency of the Chamber of Commerce and transferring her as a consultant in the Administrative Chamber, which made her conclude after that that the President of the Council was under pressure and influence Higher authorities. According to the sources of "El Khabar" when confronted with these facts, the council president did not hesitate to hold the responsibility to the Inspector General, who said that he was the one who prevented the chamber's president from conducting a complementary investigation in the case, and when he refused his order to dismiss her and appoint her as a consultant in the real estate chamber, Considering that the disciplinary penalties to which the President of the Chamber was subjected were the result of the instructions of the Inspector General, who faces very heavy charges in this file. Saïd Bouteflika (brother of the President of the Republic) Abdelaziz Bouteflika in that time when asked about this case completely denied his knowledge of it or his knowledge of the judges who intervened in the matter, in this case Haddad was charged with participating in abuse of office and incitement to prejudice, Louh also faced charges of obstruction of justice and incitement to prejudice in this case.

Groupe SERPORT New Owner (2020–)

New era and new management 
After it was expected that the general assembly of shareholders will be on March 12, 2020, it was submitted to March 2, especially after the imprisonment of the former club president, Rabouh Haddad. The meeting witnessed the attendance of ETRHB Haddad representative and the absence of the amateur club president Saïd Allik, and after two and a half hours, it was announced that Groupe SERPORT had bought the shares of ETRHB Haddad which amounted to 94.34%. in a press conference Halim Hammoudi, Secretary General of SERPORT announced that Aïn Benian project and the club headquarters will be launched soon. He also said that the goal is to achieve continental titles, not only local ones. Previously Achour Djelloul general manager of SERPORT, said they would invest between 1,2 and 1,3 billion dinar per year, while the training center project will cost 1,4 billion dinar. On May 13, 2020, Achour Djelloul announced that he signed with Antar Yahia to be the new Sporting director for three years and Abdelghani Haddi as a new general manager. Yahia said that he had offers from France, but he preferred the Reds and Blacks project, especially the ideas he wanted to implement are the same as Achour Djelloul. On July 31, Abdelghani Haddi spoke about some newspapers and responded to them and the fake news about the value of buying USM Alger's shares, where he said that the amount was 2 billion dinars about 13 million euros, for information SERPORT is a holding company which manages the State's holdings in Algerian port services. It generates a turnover of nearly 500 million euros per year, for a net profit which oscillates between 25 and 40 million euros. On July 20, FIFA prohibiting USM Alger from any recruitment of Algerian or foreign players during the next three transfer window until the payment of 200,000 euros to the former player Prince Ibara. The next day General Manager Abdelghani Haddi spoke about this problem, and also the problem of the former player Mohamed Yekhlef and the Derby case, Where did Haddi say that he asked the Algerian Football Federation to pay Ibara's money from 2019–20 CAF Champions League prize money.

On August 28, USM Alger would have won their Darby case against the Algerian Football Federation and the Ligue de Football Professionnel after postponing several times the final decision was return of the three points and replay the match, and makes the LFP and FAF bear all the costs incurred by the arbitration procedure. On October 30, Groupe SERPORT decided to merge the position of Sports Director and General Manager and Achour Djelloul give all powers to Antar Yahia he said "We want to avoid mixing things up", due to the COVID-19 pandemic in Algeria, the Algerian Super Cup has become threatened with cancellation On October 4, The Federal Bureau decided that the final play before the start of the 2020–21 season. After losing the Super Cup final, USM Alger decided to dismiss François Ciccolini from his post because he did not rise to the podium to receive the medal, which was considered an insult to an official body Where was the Prime Minister Abdelaziz Djerad present. société sportive par actions (SSPA) and club sportif amateur (CSA) signed a partnership agreement on January 31, 2021, this agreement that allows the two parties to comply with Algerian legislative texts, and the amateur club will receive 30 million dinars annually in exchange for carrying the logo and name of the club. four rounds before the end of the season SERPORT decided to dismiss Antar Yahia from his position, Yahia said that all powers were removed and they agreed with a new sports director a while ago. On August 24, 2021, Mohamed Lamine Zemmamouche became the first player in USMA to reach 400 matches, after the last round match of the 2020–21 season against JSM Skikda.

Achour Djelloul spoke on Channel 3 and made revelations about it, that was is first and foremost the relationship between an employer and an employee. Add to that Yahia was punished twice by the Disciplinary Committee, and for this we preferred to separate ourselves from this employee, Djelloul reveals that Denis Lavagne will be the new coach of Soustara's. and USM Alger signed with the former player Hocine Achiou to be the new sporting director. He stated that he is happy to return to his home in order to build the new USM Alger, and talked about the things that will be fixed and that the team's prestige must be restored and that it always plays for titles, and that he aspires to have USMA its own stadium. On December 24, USM Alger decided to terminate the contract with Denis Lavagne due to poor results. After a series of negative results and seven consecutive matches without a win, On April 15, 2022 USM Alger decided to terminate the services of sports director Hocine Achiou, Asked on National Radio about a possible withdrawal from Groupe SERPORT, Achour Djelloul assured that the public company had no intention of separating from USM Alger. On May 6, 2022 Djelloul stated that those who promote the return of Saïd Allik do not want the best for the club and that they will give up the position of sports director, and that they officially requested to take advantage of Baraki Stadium, because Omar Hamadi Stadium has become a danger to the supporters. days later Djelloul was dismissed from his post after the scandal of the exit of containers of Hyundai cars imported by the Tahkout company in 2019, and was replaced by the former CEO of  l’entreprise portuaire d’annaba (EPAN) Abdelkarim Harkati temporarily. On June 9, 2022 Madjid Bougherra manager of the Algeria A' national team decided to lay off the players for one day. Billel Benhammouda on the road between Douaouda and Bou Ismaïl, he had a fatal traffic accident with his friend. The next day after a DNA examination his death was announced Benhammouda died at the age of 24.

Crisis and administrative problems
On 26 June 2022, Sid Ahmed Arab has succeeded Achour Djelloul who has been imprisoned, as the new president of the club. Reda Abdouche has been appointed as the new general director. On July 6, Jamil Benouahi extended his contract for another year to remain the head coach for the new season. On August 1, USM Alger delegation expected to move to Antalya, Turkey, to take a preparatory training for the start of the season. But on the day of travel Benouahi and some players refused to travel because of their financial dues and also because of the absence of Mustapha Bouchina and the coach's assistant on the travel list, immediately after that USM Alger administration decided to dismiss the coach from his position. The next day, 14 players, Kamel Boudjenane and Lounès Gaouaoui signed a document that refused to dismiss Benouahi and demanded the departure of some of those in the administration and the assistant coach Sofiane Benkhelifa who was appointed by them, as well as Farid Saffar a person according to the coach and supporters the cause of all the problems and does not have any position in the club. The leaders of USM Alger have put an end to the functions of the technical staff of Benouahi, were dismissed from their posts after a hearing before the disciplinary board, This decision follows Benouahi's refusal to leave for an internship in Turkey without his assistant coach as well as Bouchina, USMA management having not obtained visas for them. On November 7, 2022 USM Alger announced to the public opinion that it had settled the case of coach Denis Lavagne by paying the full financial dues he demanded through "FIFA", USMA considered that the case of Lavane is from the "past", and this file was finally closed after transferring the funds to his account within the legal deadlines set by the "FIFA".

References

External links

Official websites
Site officiel
USM Alger at FIFA

USM Alger
A